Gavin Lidlow (born 8 November 1972 in The Hague) is a sailor from the Netherlands, who represented his country at the 2012 Vintage Yachting Games in Bellano Italy. Lidlow in the middle as tacktician together with helmsman Rudy den Outer and Ramzi Souli on the foredeck took the Silver medal in the Soling. During the 2012 Soling Europeans in Aarhus, Denmark as well as at the 2014 Soling Europeans in Saint-Pierre-Quiberon, France the same team took the 3rd place.
Gavin holds several Dutch titles in the Soling. He is member of the Kralingsche Zeil Club in Rotterdam.

Personal life 
Lidlow lives in Dirksland with his daughter and works as project engineer/Network designer in the IT industry.

References

1972 births
Living people
Dutch male sailors (sport)
Laser class sailors
Sportspeople from The Hague
Soling class sailors